The Comunidad de Madrid Ladies Open is a professional golf tournament on the Ladies European Tour, first played in 2022. 

The tournament will be the first of the 2022 LET season to be played on European soil after events in Africa, the Middle East, Asia and Australia. It marks the LET's return to Madrid after nine years of absence, the city last hosted the Open de España Femenino in 2013.

Winners

References

External links
Ladies European Tour
Jarama-RACE Golf Club

Madrid Ladies Open
Golf tournaments in Spain
Sports competitions in Madrid